John Davey may refer to:

John Davey (swimmer) (born 1964), former British Olympic swimmer
John Davey (tree surgeon) (1846–1923), considered the father of tree surgery
John Davey (Cornish speaker) (1812–1891), Cornish farmer
John Davey (cricketer) (1847–1878), English cricketer
John Ryan Davey (1913–1992), Australian cricketer
John Richard Davey (1957–2021), Australian cricketer
John Davey (actor), American actor, best known for portraying Captain Marvel on the 1970s TV series Shazam!
John Davey (master) (1732–1798), Master of Balliol College, Oxford
Jack Davey (1907–1959), radio personality
Jack Davey (cricketer) (born 1944), former English cricketer
Gerry Davey (John Gerald Davey, 1914–1977), British ice hockey player

See also
John Davy (disambiguation)
John Davie (disambiguation)
John Davys (disambiguation)
John Davis (disambiguation)
John Davies (disambiguation)